Godstar may refer to:
 "Godstar" (song), a 1985 song by Psychic TV
 Godstar (band), a psychedelic pop band